The Roman Catholic Archdiocese of Suva (Latin: Archidioecesis Suvana) is  a Metropolitan Archdiocese in Fiji. It is responsible for the suffragan dioceses of Rarotonga and Tarawa and Nauru and —as of 21 March 2003—the Mission Sui Iuris of Funafuti. The archdiocese was created in 1966, to succeed the Apostolic Vicariate of Fiji.

History
The Fiji Islands were included in the territory of the old Vicariate Apostolic of Central Oceania, created by Propaganda Fide in 1842. The first Catholic mission in Fiji was founded in 1844, and on 10 March 1863, the territory was erected into a prefecture Apostolic. On 5 May 1887, the vicariate was established as the Vicariate Apostolic of Fiji and entrusted to the Marist fathers. The first Apostolic vicar was the Right Rev. Julian Vidal, D.D., S.M., titular Bishop of Abydos (consecrated 27 December 1887). Catholic missions soon were established on the islands Viti Levu, Ovalau, Vanua Levu, Tavenui, Kadavu and Rotuma, the official residence of the vicar Apostolic being at Suva on Viti Levu.
 
The English college at Cawaci for the training of catechists and the children of the chiefs had 42 catechists, 80 boys and 12 girls. In the central stations the Marist brothers and sisters taught reading, writing etc., as well as religion, to 500 boys and 450 girls, while in the villages 315 catechists give elementary instruction to about 2000 children. The churches and chapels numbered 65, and the total -minoritarian- Catholic population about 12,000 (300 Europeans). A station for lepers was conducted on Makogai Island by one Marist father and two sisters of the Third Order of Mary.
 
In 1966 it was promoted as Metropolitan Archdiocese of Suva, which has three suffragans on other island states: Rarotonga (Cook Islands), Tarawa (Kiribati) and Nauru (both last-named states are independent).

Bishops

Ordinaries
Bishops
 (1863–1887)
Julien Vidal (1887–1922)
Charles-Joseph Nicolas (1922–1941)
Victor Frederick Foley (1944–1967)
Archbishops
George Hamilton Pearce (1967–1976)
Petero Mataca (1976–2012)
Peter Loy Chong (since 2013)

Coadjutor vicar apostolic
Charles-Joseph Nicolas (1918-1922)

Auxiliary bishop
Petero Mataca (1974-1976), appointed Archbishop here

Sex abuse cases
On 13 July 2020, New Zealand's 1News revealed that of some of the clergy who were accused in 1,300 cases of sexually abusing children in the nation of Fiji were originally from New Zealand before they were transferred. The transfer of these priests is the subject of a Royal Commission investigation. Dr Murray Heasley from the Network of Survivors in Faith Based Institution told 1News that Fiji was a common place for the New Zealand Catholic Church to transfer accused Catholic clergy. Despite Archbishop Peter Loy Chong's statement that there had been no reported cases of clergy abusing children in Fiji, Australian priest Julian Fox, who was later convicted and jailed in 2015 for child sex crimes, had been transferred to Fiji in 1999 after Australian police started an investigation against him. It was also proven that the church had knowledge of sex abuse allegations against Fox nine years before he was charged.

References

External links

Suva
Catholic Church in Fiji
Suva
Suva
Christian organizations established in 1966